Dukuchhap is a village development committee in Lalitpur District in the Bagmati Zone of central Nepal. At the time of the 1991 Nepal census it had a population of 3501 .

References

External links
UN map of the municipalities of Lalitpur District

Populated places in Lalitpur District, Nepal